The British Virgin Islands has competed in every Summer Olympic Games since 1984. The best placement by an athlete from the country is fourth, by Kyron McMaster in men's 400m hurdles in 2020.

The British Virgin Islands has competed twice at the Winter Olympics, first in 1984, and then in 2014. Their best placement in the Winter Olympic is 27th, by Peter Crook in the men's halfpipe skiing.

The team uses the islands' territorial anthem, "Oh, Beautiful Virgin Islands", starting in 2020. Prior to this, the team had used the anthem of the United Kingdom, "God Save the Queen".

Medal tables

Medals by Summer Games

Medals by Winter Games

See also
 List of flag bearers for the British Virgin Islands at the Olympics
 Tropical nations at the Winter Olympics

References

External links